Dennis Ray Jackson (8 March 1932 – 20 March 2014) was an English professional footballer who played as a full back.

Career
Born in Birmingham, Jackson played for West Bromwich Albion, Hednesford Town, Aston Villa, Millwall and Rugby Town.

Later life and death
Jackson died in March 2014 at the age of 82.

References

1932 births
2014 deaths
Association football fullbacks
Aston Villa F.C. players
English Football League players
English footballers
Footballers from Birmingham, West Midlands
Hednesford Town F.C. players
Millwall F.C. players
Rugby Town F.C. (1945) players
West Bromwich Albion F.C. players